The Nambiyar river runs across Nanguneri taluk in Tirunelveli district in Tamil Nadu state in India. It is a small river which runs for only .

Tributaries 
The river has two tributaries called Parattaiyar and Thamaraiyar. Parattaiyar is a small stream originating from Mahendragiri Hills. Thamaraiyar is a combination of two small streams also originating in the same hills named Mombaiyar and Kodumudiyar. Both the tributaries join Nambiyar at the foothills of Mahendragiri Hills.

Anaicuts 
The river has a total number of nine anaicuts.

References 

Rivers of Tamil Nadu
Geography of Tirunelveli district
Rivers of India